Jasha Sütterlin (born 4 November 1992 in Freiburg im Breisgau) is a German cyclist, who currently rides for UCI WorldTeam . He was named in the start list for the 2016 Giro d'Italia, the 2017 Tour de France, and the 2020 Vuelta a España.

Major results

2009
 3rd Overall Regio-Tour Juniors
 7th Overall Trofeo Karlsberg
2010
 1st  Time trial, National Junior Road Championships
 1st Overall Niedersachsen–Rundfahrt Juniors
 UCI Juniors Road World Championships
2nd  Time trial
8th Road race
 2nd Overall Giro della Lunigiana
 3rd Overall Trofeo Karlsberg
1st Stage 4
 4th Overall Regio-Tour Juniors
2011
 1st  Overall Tour de Berlin
 4th Memorial Davide Fardelli
2012
 1st  Time trial, National Under-23 Road Championships
 7th Overall Thüringen Rundfahrt der U23
 8th Time trial, UCI Under-23 Road World Championships
2013
 1st  Time trial, National Under-23 Road Championships
 Giro della Valle d'Aosta
1st Prologue & Stage 5
 3rd  Time trial, UEC European Under-23 Road Championships
 3rd Overall Tour de Bretagne
2015
 3rd  Team time trial, UCI Road World Championships
 10th Overall Bayern–Rundfahrt
2016
 2nd Time trial, National Road Championships
2017
 1st Stage 3 Vuelta a la Comunidad de Madrid
 2nd Time trial, National Road Championships
 10th Down Under Classic
2018
 2nd Time trial, National Road Championships
 6th Overall Tour of Britain
2019
 2nd  Mixed team relay, UCI Road World Championships
 2nd  Mixed team relay, UEC European Road Championships
 3rd Time trial, National Road Championships
 9th E3 Binckbank Classic
2020
 5th Overall Okolo Slovenska

Grand Tour general classification results timeline

References

External links

1992 births
Living people
German male cyclists
Sportspeople from Freiburg im Breisgau
Cyclists from Baden-Württemberg